= Discount Universe =

Australian fashion label

Discount Universe, (stylised as DI$COUNT UNIVER$E) is an Australian fashion label developed by Nadia Napreychikov and Cami James. Their designs have been featured in major Australian exhibitions such the National Gallery of Victoria's exhibition, 200 Years of Australian Fashion, and Know My Name at the National Gallery of Australia.

== History ==
James and Napreychikov met while studying at RMIT in Melbourne, Australia. Following their 2009 brand manifesto, the label launched via their website in 2010. The brand manifesto indicated a consciousness for the re-appropriation and imitation that is present in post-modern fashion. James and Napreychikov began with handmade riveted jackets, followed by sequinned and beaded clothing the brand is now synonymous with.

In 2016, James and Napreychikov moved their studio from Melbourne to New York.

== Collections and influence ==
The brand is known for their 'anti-seasonal' approach to fashion as a response to the limitations of the Australian fashion industry at the time of its inception. Their clothing often features feminist and political statements, and through the release of their collections on their website, the brand has been able to garner international attention and sell to a global audience.

In 2015, Rihanna was seen wearing a Di$count Univer$e dress with the words 'you will never own me/I will never fear you' over the front and back.

Their 2019 collection, developed during the MeToo movement, featured in their 2018 New York Fashion Week showcase. The collection featured cisgender and transgender models in slippers wearing designs with statements such as ‘I AM NOT SORRY/I AM NOT FOR SALE/I AM NOT FOR REPRODUCTION' in bold glitter, protesting against the objectification of women.

== Exhibitions ==
- 200 Years of Australian Fashion, at the National Gallery of Victoria, 5 March 2016 – 31 July 2016.
- It's-too-soon-for-a-retrospective Retrospective Exhibition, 32-34 Wellington Street, Collingwood, 29 November 2016 – December 9, 2016.
- Know My Name, Part One, at the National Gallery of Australia, 14 November 2020 – 9 May 2021.
